The 2019 NCAA Division III Men's Ice Hockey Tournament was the culmination of the 2018–19 season, the 36th such tournament in NCAA history. It concluded with Wisconsin–Stevens Point defeating Norwich in the championship game 3-2 in overtime. All First Round and Quarterfinal matchups were held at home team venues, while all succeeding games were played at the K.B. Willett Arena in Stevens Point, Wisconsin.

Wisconsin–Stevens Point became the first Division III team to win a National Championship without losing a single game during the season.

Qualifying teams
Twelve teams qualified for the tournament in the following ways: (Pool A) eight teams received bids as a result of being conference tournament champions from conferences that possessed an automatic bid, (Pool C) four additional teams received at-large bids based upon their records.

Format
The tournament featured four rounds of play. All rounds were Single-game elimination.

Because fewer than four western teams qualified, the tournament was arranged so that all western teams were placed into one quarterfinal bracket. The nine eastern qualifying eastern teams were arranged evenly across the remaining three quarterfinal brackets. The top three eastern seeds and the top western seed received byes into the quarterfinal round and were arranged so that the bracket containing the top overall seed would play the bracket containing the third eastern seed.

The six eastern teams in the quarterfinals were arranged so that the fourth- and ninth-seeded teams would play with the winner advancing to play the third eastern seed, the fifth- and eighth-seeded teams would play with the winner advancing to play the second eastern seed and the sixth- and seventh-seeded teams would play with the winner advancing to play the first eastern seed. The second and third western teams would play in the first round with the winner advancing to face the top western seed.

In the First Round and Quarterfinals the higher-seeded team served as host.

Tournament Bracket

Note: * denotes overtime period(s)

All-Tournament Team
G: Connor Ryckman (Wisconsin–Stevens Point)
D: Danny Kiraly (Wisconsin–Stevens Point)
D: David Robertson (Norwich)
F: Tanner Karty* (Wisconsin–Stevens Point)
F: Colin Raver (Wisconsin–Stevens Point)
F: Coby Downs (Norwich)
* Most Outstanding Player(s)

Record by conference

References

External links
Division III Men's Ice Hockey Record Book

 
NCAA Division III ice hockey